The 1996 Winnipeg Blue Bombers finished in 3rd place in the West Division with a 9–9 record. They appeared in the West Semi-Final.

Offseason

CFL Draft

Regular season

Season standings

Season schedule

Playoffs

West Semi-Final

Awards and records

1996 CFL All-Stars
LB – K.D. Williams, CFL All-Star

References

Winnipeg Blue Bombers seasons
Winn